The Deputy Prime Minister of Rhodesia was the deputy head of government of Rhodesia (Southern Rhodesia until 1964), serving under the Prime Minister of Rhodesia. Rhodesia, which became a self-governing colony of the United Kingdom in 1923, unilaterally declared independence on 11 November 1965, and was thereafter an unrecognized state until 1979. In December 1979, the country came under temporary British control, and in April 1980 the country gained recognized independence as Zimbabwe.

List of deputy prime ministers

References 

Rhodesia
Rhodesian politicians

Lists of political office-holders in Zimbabwe
Lists of Rhodesian people